This is a list of Danish television related events from 1966.

Events
6 February - Ulla Pia is selected to represent Denmark at the 1966 Eurovision Song Contest with her song "Stop – mens legen er go'". She is selected to be the tenth Danish Eurovision entry during Dansk Melodi Grand Prix held at the Tivolis Koncertsal in Copenhagen.

Debuts

Television shows

Ending this year

Births
29 April - Mayianne Dinesen, TV host
5 November - Sofie Stougaard, actress

Deaths

See also
 1966 in Denmark